Isaac Nnamdi Okoro (born January 26, 2001) is an American professional basketball player for the Cleveland Cavaliers of the National Basketball Association (NBA). He played college basketball for the Auburn Tigers.

Okoro played basketball for McEachern High School in Georgia for four years, helping his team win the state championship and achieve national success in his senior season. He was considered a five-star recruit by Rivals and a four-star recruit by 247Sports and ESPN. After his freshman college season at Auburn, he was named to the second team All-SEC.

Early life
Okoro was born in Atlanta, Georgia to Nigerian parents and was raised close to metro Atlanta. His father, Godwin, emigrated from Nigeria in the 1980s. His mother, Gloria, is also from Nigeria. Okoro started playing basketball in his local church league. When he was around seven to eight years old, he began training under the guidance of Amateur Athletic Union (AAU) coach Omar Cooper, the father of his future high school teammate, Sharife Cooper. He played for the A.O.T. Running Rebels of the Nike EYBL circuit.

High school career
Okoro played high school basketball for McEachern High School in Powder Springs, Georgia. In his freshman season, he averaged 15 points and eight rebounds per game, helping his team win the regional title and reach the Georgia High School Association Class 7A state quarterfinals. As a sophomore, Okoro averaged 22.5 points per game, leading McEachern to the regional championship and the Class 7A state semifinals. He earned Atlanta Journal-Constitution Class 7A All-State second team and MaxPreps Sophomore All-American third team honors. In his junior season, Okoro averaged 20.3 points and 6.4 rebounds per game, helping McEachern reach the Class 7A state quarterfinals. He was named to the Atlanta Journal-Constitution Class 7A All-State first team and the USA Today All-USA Georgia first team. In the offseason, Okoro had success on the Nike Elite Youth Basketball League, a prominent amateur circuit, with Athletes of Tomorrow.

In his senior season, Okoro averaged 19.7 points, 10.6 rebounds, 3.2 assists and 2.7 steals per game. He led McEachern to titles at the City of Palms Classic and the Tournament of Champions. His team ended the regular season with a 32–0 record, becoming the first undefeated team in the highest Georgia classification since 1995 and receiving a  1 national ranking from multiple websites, including MaxPreps. Okoro scored 16 points to help his team win its first Class 7A state championship. He shared Atlanta Journal-Constitution state most valuable player recognition with teammate Sharife Cooper. Okoro was named to the MaxPreps All-American second team and the USA Today All-USA Georgia first team. On April 12, 2019, Okoro competed in the Nike Hoop Summit, an international all-star game. On April 26, 2019, Okoro became only the second basketball player in McEachern history to have his jersey retired.

Recruiting
By the end of his high school career, Okoro was considered a five-star recruit by Rivals and a four-star recruit by 247Sports and ESPN. On July 25, 2018, he committed to play college basketball for Auburn over offers from Florida, Florida State, Oregon and Texas, among others. Okoro became the second-highest ranked commit in program history, according to 247Sports composite rankings, behind only Mustapha Heron.

College career
Okoro scored 12 points in his Auburn debut, a 84–73 win over Georgia Southern. The following game, he attained 17 points in a 76–66 victory over Davidson. Okoro was named Southeastern Conference (SEC) Freshman of the Week on November 18, 2019. He scored a season-high 23 points in a 83–79 win over Vanderbilt on January 8, 2020. Okoro did not play in a February 15 game against Missouri due to a hamstring injury.
After the regular season, he was named to the All-SEC Second Team, the SEC All-Freshman Team and the SEC All-Defensive Team by the league's coaches. Okoro averaged 12.9 points, 4.4 rebounds and two assists per game. After his freshman season, he announced that he would enter the 2020 NBA draft.

Professional career

Cleveland Cavaliers (2020–present)
Okoro was selected with the fifth pick overall by the Cleveland Cavaliers in the 2020 NBA draft. Three days later on November 21, the Cleveland Cavaliers announced that they had signed Okoro. In the Cleveland Cavaliers first preseason game of the 2020–21 NBA season, he got the game winning and-one to make it 114–116 and converted the free throw to make it 114–117 and win against the Indiana Pacers. On December 23, 2020, Okoro made his NBA debut, starting and recording 11 points, five assists, and three rebounds in a 121–114 win over the Charlotte Hornets. On May 4, 2021, Okoro scored a career-high 32 points during an overtime loss to the Phoenix Suns.

National team career
Okoro played for the United States at the 2018 FIBA Under-17 Basketball World Cup in Argentina. In seven games, he averaged 4.3 points, 1.9 rebounds and 1.6 steals per game, helping his team win the gold medal.

Career statistics

NBA

|-
| style="text-align:left;"| 
| style="text-align:left;"| Cleveland
| 67 || 67 || 32.4 || .420 || .290 || .726 || 3.1 || 1.9 || .9 || .4 || 9.6
|-
| style="text-align:left;"| 
| style="text-align:left;"| Cleveland
| 67 || 61 || 29.6 || .480 || .350 || .768 || 3.0 || 1.8 || .8 || .3 || 8.8
|- class="sortbottom"
| style="text-align:center;" colspan="2"|Career
| 134 || 128 || 31.0 || .446 || .315 || .747 || 3.0 || 1.9 || .9 || .3 || 9.2

College

|-
| style="text-align:left;"| 2019–20
| style="text-align:left;"| Auburn
| 28 || 28 || 31.5 || .514 || .290 || .672 || 4.4 || 2.0 || .9 || .9 || 12.9
|- class="sortbottom"
| style="text-align:center;" colspan="2"|Career
| 28 || 28 || 31.5 || .514 || .290 || .672 || 4.4 || 2.0 || .9 || .9 || 12.9

References

External links

Auburn Tigers bio
USA Basketball bio

Living people
2001 births
African-American basketball players
American men's basketball players
American sportspeople of Nigerian descent
Auburn Tigers men's basketball players
Cleveland Cavaliers draft picks
Cleveland Cavaliers players
Small forwards
Basketball players from Atlanta
21st-century African-American sportspeople